Bernadette Vela Punzalan-Field (born November 20, 1968), known professionally as Princess Punzalan, is a Filipino actress. She began her career starring in Lovingly Yours: The Movie (1984) and Lovingly Yours, Helen (1992-96) and was nominated of PMPC Star Awards for Television in 1987. Her profile continued to grow when she starred as antagonist Selina Pereira-Matias in Mula sa Puso (1997–99) with Claudine Barretto, and won Best Actress in 1998.

Career
Princess Punzalan started out her career as one of the regular co-host in now defunct GMA Network Sunday noontime musical variety show GMA Supershow. Soon after she was launched in her own afternoon TV drama anthology entitled "Princess" in 1987 which was produced by her mom Helen Vela's production outfit Hyper Vision. To avoid a possible collision with RPN's Coney Reyes on Camera (headline by her mom's best friend Coney), her drama anthology was aired at a later timeslot.

While her TV career began to be successful, she also branched out into making films. She made her mark in the film Kung Tapos Na ang Kailanman (shown in 1990) which gave her a FAMAS nomination for Best Actress.

In 1989, her drama series was cancelled to make way for Family 3+1, a sitcom which she headlined with her mother Helen Vela and also starred Ronaldo Valdez and Caridad Sanchez. The show made waves and even received 2 awards for Best Comedy Show at Star Awards. But with the untimely death of its main star Helen Vela caused the show to gradually decline until it was cancelled. Soon after, Princess filled in the void left by her mother (as producer-host/actress) in the drama anthology Lovingly Yours, Helen which was renamed Lovingly Yours. The reformatted drama anthology survived for four more years until it was ended by the GMA management in 1996.

She became popular for her role as antagonist Selina Pereira-Matias in the 1997 hit TV series Mula sa Puso starring Claudine Barretto, aired in ABS-CBN.

In the later 2000s, she transferred back to GMA and did supporting/main roles. One of her last TV series as a series regular was Kung Mawawala Ka a political drama on primetime airing on GMA Network which garnered attention at the time of its back to back battle with the drama series Pangako Sa 'Yo.

She returned to film as co-teacher and Mila's best friend in Mila played by Maricel Soriano.

In 2005, she played the evil aunt of Ryza Cenon and LJ Reyes in GMA Network's afternoon drama series and Now and Forever first installment series Mukha and then moved back to ABS-CBN though was only visible on Maalaala Mo Kaya. She appeared in The Last Prince (2010) starring Aljur Abrenica and Kris Bernal, where Punzalan played an evil witch named Alwana.

She returned to ABS-CBN in 2015 after five years with GMA-7.

She appeared in the GMA Films and Regal Films movie My Valentine Girls with Richard Gutierrez. She did a film Johnny Loves Dolores (2012), an entry in the San Francisco International Asian Film Festival, directed by Clarissa delos Reyes.

Punzalan is now based in the United States, fulfilling her duties as a registered nurse.

Personal life
The daughter of Orly Punzalan (a broadcaster who was formerly the president of IBC) and actress/host Helen Vela (now both deceased), her siblings are Meg, Reuben, and Paolo (senior pastor of Victory Fort Bonifacio).
 A niece is a model and YouTube vlogger Janina Vela Punzalan.

Punzalan was previously married to controversial TV host and actor Willie Revillame.  She later settled in California in 2005 after marrying Jason Field, an American marketing professional. The couple has a daughter.

Filmography

Television

Film

Awards and nominations

See also
Eula Valdez
Kate Valdez
Star Drama Presents

References

External links

1968 births
Living people
ABS-CBN personalities
Filipino expatriates in the United States
Filipino film actresses
Filipino television actresses
Filipino nurses
GMA Network personalities
People from Northern Samar